Seal the Deal & Let's Boogie is the sixth studio album by Danish rock band Volbeat. The album was released on 3 June 2016. It is the first album not to feature Anders Kjølholm who left in November the previous year.

Background
In April 2015, singer Michael Poulsen revealed that he had so far written seven songs for the album. In November 2015 it was reported that bassist Anders Kjølholm had left the band. According to Poulsen the band sat down and talked about the coming year and "there were some things that we couldn't agree on", adding "there was no big drama". Kaspar Boye Larsen was announced as the replacement for Kjølholm in May 2016, after having played bass for Volbeat on their recent US tour. Larsen had known Michael Poulsen and drummer Jon Larsen since the early 1990s, and replaced Anders Kjølholm on Volbeat's first European tour in 2006.

On 7 April 2016 Volbeat announced the release of Seal the Deal & Let's Boogie. Lead guitarist Rob Caggiano said of the musical content of the album: "There's definitely some stuff that kind of weaves in and out of the record. You know, the last album was leaning heavily towards like the Western stuff and, you know, outlaws and cowboys and that kind of thing, and this is a whole different thing. There's definitely some cool characters and some voodoo stuff on this record, which I always found fascinating." Lead singer Michael Poulsen stated that he believes in the spirit world, saying: "I've always been very interested in the spiritual world and all those kinds of things. Also dark, spiritual things… I guess it's just something that a lot of guys in the metal and rock scene are very into. I just remember very interested in it since I was a teenager, seeing a lot of horror movies, which I still do." Poulsen has also called the album a "spiritual album, because the lyrics are very spiritual. They're not religious; we're not religious believers, but we do believe in the spirit world."

Musically, the album is more melodic and less heavy metal-sounding than previous albums, with Michael Poulsen admitting "it seems to be more of a rock album". For the first time Volbeat are using female backing vocals on several songs by singer Mia Maja, and "Goodbye Forever" features the Harlem Gospel Choir. Poulsen has said he is the most proud of the album's choruses, which he has called "the strongest I've ever done". Singer Danko Jones features on the song "Black Rose", who Poulsen had stayed in touch with since he first met him when Jones' band played a concert in Copenhagen in 2006.

Singles
"The Devil's Bleeding Crown" was released as the album's first single in North America on 7 April 2016. The single peaked at number one on Billboard's Mainstream Rock Songs chart in the United States.

Internationally, "For Evigt" (meaning "Forever") was released as the first single on 29 April 2016. The song features Danish singer Johan Olsen of rock group Magtens Korridorer, and is the second collaboration between Olsen and Volbeat following "The Garden's Tale" (2007). "For Evigt" is replaced by "The Bliss" on the North American version, where the Danish chorus sung by Olsen is sung by Michael Poulsen in English.

"Seal the Deal" was released as the album's second international single on 20 May 2016. On 13 September 2016, it is set to be sent to US active rock radio as the album's second single in North America. "Seal the Deal" peaked at number three on the Billboard Mainstream Rock Songs chart.

"Black Rose" was released as the third single in North America, where it was sent to active rock radio stations in the US on 7 March 2017. The song peaked at number one on the Billboard Mainstream Rock Songs chart in the US, becoming Volbeat's sixth number-one single on the chart.

Commercial performance
The album debuted at number one in Denmark. It sold 8,336 units in its opening week, the biggest first-week sales of 2016. In the United States, Seal the Deal & Let's Boogie debuted at number four on the Billboard 200 with first-week sales of 51,000 units. It is the band's highest-charting album in the US and the second-highest charting album by a Danish act behind Lukas Graham's Blue Album, which charted at number three two months prior. The album debuted at number 16 in the UK Albums Chart, selling 4,083 copies in its first week.

Track listing

Personnel

Michael Poulsen – vocals, rhythm guitar, co-producer
Rob Caggiano – lead guitar, bass, acoustic guitar, co-producer, recording
Jon Larsen – drums
Jacob Hansen – producer, recording, handclaps, percussion, additional vocals
Bryan Russell – recording, additional editing
Tue Bayer – guitar technician, handclaps
Martin Pagaard Wolff – drum technician
Eric Stablein – handclaps
Rod Sinclair – banjo

Johan Olsen – additional vocals
Mia Maja – additional vocals
Anders Pedersen – lap steel guitar, slide guitar
Vic Florencia – Danko Jones vocal recording
Danko Jones – additional vocals
The Harlem Gospel Choir – choir
Henning Skovskjalden – bagpipes
Joe Barresi – mixer
Bob Ludwig – mastering

Charts

Weekly charts

Year-end charts

Certifications

References

External links
 

2016 albums
Albums produced by Jacob Hansen
Republic Records albums
Universal Records albums
Vertigo Records albums
Volbeat albums